The term Serbian Church can refer to:

 Serbian Orthodox Church, an Eastern Orthodox Church
 Serbian True Orthodox Church, a non-canonical Eastern Orthodox church
 Catholic Church in Serbia
 Greek Catholic Eparchy of Ruski Krstur, an eparchy (diocese) for Eastern Catholics of the Byzantine Rite in Serbia
 Serbian Old-Catholic Church, a former old-catholic church in Serbia, that existed in the second half of the 20th century

See also 
 Serbian Orthodox Church (disambiguation)
 Serbian Catholic Church
 Montenegrin Church (disambiguation)